Deutsche Messe ("German Mass"; full title: , "German Mass and Order of Worship") was published by Martin Luther in 1526. It followed his work Formula missae from the year 1523, pertaining to the celebration of a Latin mass. Both of these masses were meant only as suggestions made on request and were not expected to be used exactly as they were, but could be altered. The function of the mass, according to Luther, is to make people hear the word.

The German Mass was completely chanted, except for the sermon.

Order of Luther's Deutsche Messe 
 A spiritual song or a psalm in German
 Kyrie eleison (three fold)
 Collect (read facing the altar)
 Epistle (read facing the people)
 A German hymn (by the whole choir)
 Gospel (read facing the people)
 Creed sung in German
 Sermon (on the Gospel)
 Paraphrase of the Lord's Prayer
 Exhortation to those who will commune
 Consecration of the Bread.
 Elevation of the Body of Christ
 Distribution of the Body of Christ
 Sanctus paraphrased in German (or the hymns "Gott sei gelobet und gebenedeiet" or "Jesus Christus, unser Heiland, der von uns den Gotteszorn wandt")
 Consecration of the Wine
 Distribution of the Blood of Christ
 Sanctus or Agnus Dei in German (or the hymns "Gott sei gelobet und gebenedeiet" or "Jesus Christus, unser Heiland, der von uns den Gotteszorn wandt")
 Thanksgiving Collect
 Aaronic Benediction

References

External links 
 Luther, Martin (1483-1546): Deutsche Messe, 1526 as an original German text
 The German Mass and Order of Divine Service (Hanover Historical Texts Project)
 Luther, Liturgies of, article from Christian Cyclopedia
 Luther’s Liturgical Reforms a comparison of Luther's Latin Mass and his German Mass at the WorshipConcord Project.

1526 works
16th-century Christian texts
Lutheran liturgy and worship
Works by Martin Luther
Christian liturgical texts